Bairrada is a Portuguese wine region located in the Beira Litoral Province. The region has Portugal's highest wine classification as a Denominação de Origem Controlada (DOC), and its popularity has surged over the last years. It is small and quite narrow coastal region, part of the broader region of Beira Atlântico, and it is bordered to the northeast by the Lafões IPR and to the east by the Dão DOC.

It is located close to the Atlantic Ocean and the currents have a moderating effect on the climate, resulting in a mild, maritime climate with abundant rainfall. The region is hilly, but the majority of the vineyards are placed on flatter land.

About 2/3 of the national sparkling wine production takes place in this region, and in recent years the city of Anadia received the nickname of "Capital do Espumante", which translates to "Sparkling Wine Capital".

The region is also known for its deep colored tannic red wines, that often have bell pepper and black currant flavors, as well its emerging rosé production.

The boundaries of the Bairrada DOC includes the municipalities of Anadia, Cantanhede, Mealhada and Oliveira do Bairro, and some parishes in the municipalities of Vagos and Coimbra and also the parish of Nariz, in the municipality of Aveiro.

History
Viticulture in the Bairrada has existed since at least the 10th century, when the region gained independence from the Moors. Located just south of the major Port wine producing center of Porto, the fortunes of Bairrada were on the upswing during the 17th century when Port producers, eager to supply the growing British market, would blend Bairrada wines with the product coming from the Douro.

Grapes
The spotlight of the Bairrada region falls on Baga. The unique soil and climate combination from Bairrada helps taking the most of out this highly acidic and highly tannic grape, which is used in both red and sparkling wines.

Other Portuguese red grapes varieties also have a prominent place there: Alfrocheiro-Preto, Tinta Pinheira and Touriga Nacional. International red grapes varieties include Merlot and Syrah.

Regarding white grapes, the main highlights are the Portuguese varieties of Arinto, Bical, Cercial and Maria Gomes, but also the well internationally known Chardonnay.

See also
List of Portuguese wine regions

References

Wine regions of Portugal
Portuguese products with protected designation of origin